Kal Matali (also Romanized as Kal Matalī and Kal Matlī; also known as Lātīdān) is a village in Gachin Rural District, in the Central District of Bandar Abbas County, Hormozgan Province, Iran. At the 2006 census, its population was 1,589, in 325 families.

References 

Populated places in Bandar Abbas County